Sympistis basifugens is a species of moth in the family Noctuidae (the owlet moths). It is found in North America.

The MONA or Hodges number for Sympistis basifugens is 10089.

References

Further reading

External links

 

basifugens
Articles created by Qbugbot
Moths described in 1914